Ferrar is a surname. Notable people with the surname include:

Ada Ferrar (1867–1951), British actress
Beatrice Ferrar (1876–1958), British actress
Bill Ferrar (1893–1990), English mathematician
Catherine Ferrar (born 1940), American television actress
Hartley T. Ferrar (1879–1932), geologist who accompanied Captain Scott's first Antarctic expedition
Jay Ferrar (born 1966), American songwriter and musician currently based in St. Louis, Missouri
Leslie Ferrar, CVO (born 1955), Treasurer to Charles, Prince of Wales from January 2005 until July 2012
Mary Ferrar (1551–1634), founder of  religious community at Little Gidding in 1625
Michael Lloyd Ferrar, CSI, CIE, OBE (1876–1967), British commissioner of the Penal Settlement at Port Blair on Andaman Islands and Nicobar Islands
Miguel Ferrar (born 1955), American actor and voice actor mostly known for villainous roles, notably Bob Morton
Nicholas Ferrar (1592–1637), English scholar, courtier, businessman and man of religion
Robert Ferrar (died 1555), Bishop of St David's in Wales
William Hugh Ferrar (1826–1871), a Latinist, was a classical Irish scholar at Dublin University
John Ferrar Holms (1897–1934), British literary critic born in India to a British civil servant and an Irish mother

See also
Ferrar Fenton Bible, one of the earliest translations of the Bible into "modern English"
Ferrar Cluj-Napoca a football club, from Cluj-Napoca, that played both in the Hungarian and the Romanian Championship
Sundberg & Ferrar, industrial design consultancy headquartered in Walled Lake, Michigan
Ferrar Glacier, a glacier in Antarctica
Ferrar Group or Family 13, a group of Greek Gospel manuscripts varying in date from the 11th to the 15th century
Karoo-Ferrar, a major geologic province consisting of flood basalt, which mostly covers South Africa and Antarctica
Ferrara
Ferrari
Ferraria
Ferrario
Ferraro
Ferraroa